Amphitretus is a genus of pelagic gelatinous octopuses. It is the sole genus of subfamily Amphitretinae, one of three subfamilies in the family Amphitretidae and consists of two species. Some authorities consider Amphitretus thielei as a subspecies of Amphitretus pelagicus, which would make the genus monotypic.

References

 Tree of Life website gives information about the classification of cephalopod groups

Octopuses
Cephalopod genera
Taxa named by William Evans Hoyle